Events from the year 1722 in Sweden

Incumbents
 Monarch – Frederick I

Events

 - Women are banned from working in the Swedish Post office.

Births

 
 3 January - Fredrik Hasselqvist, naturalist and traveler  (died 1752) 
 18 March - Ulrika Eleonora von Düben, courtier and royal favorite  (died 1758) 
 23 December - Axel Fredrik Cronstedt, mineralogist and chemist who discovered nickel   (died 1765) 

 - Anna Elisabeth Baer, ship owner  (died 1799)

Deaths

References

 
Years of the 18th century in Sweden
Sweden